Crawford is a ghost town in Galt and Odessa Townships in Rice County, Kansas, United States.

History
For millennia, the land now known as Kansas was inhabited by Native Americans.  In 1803, most of modern Kansas was secured by the United States as part of the Louisiana Purchase.  In 1854, the Kansas Territory was organized, then in 1861 Kansas became the 34th U.S. state.  In 1867, Rice County was founded.

Crawford had a post office from the 1880s until 1953.

References

Further reading

Unincorporated communities in Kansas
Unincorporated communities in Rice County, Kansas
1880s establishments in Kansas